Myroslav Irchan (14 July 1897 – 3 November 1937) was born Andriy Babiuk on July 14, 1897 to a poor peasant family in the village of P'yadyky, Kolomyia in Ivano-Frankivsk Oblast. In 1914, he graduated from the Teacher's Seminary in Lviv.  He was a Ukrainian storywriter and playwright who moved for a time from Europe to North America, and continued to write about his European experiences while in the new world. He was also editor of a number of publications in Europe and Canada.

Ukrainian Civil War 
The first story he wrote was at the age of 17 entitled Meeting (Зустріч) using the penname Irchan.  His first collection of sketches and short stories was titled Nirvana’s Laughter (Сміх Нірвани), a condemnation of war.

He became a soldier in the Ukrainian Sich Riflemen and the Ukrainian Galician Army shortly after the outbreak of World War I. He fought in three different armies:Austro-Hungarian, Galician, and the Red Army of Ukraine.  When he ended up in the ranks of the Red Ukrainian Galician Army,  he edited its periodical Red Archer (Червоний Стрелец).  He wrote two plays about the Ukrainian Civil War in the middle of the war.  
The first of these plays was The Rebel (Бунтар), begun in the Polish–Soviet War in April 1920, and completed January 12, 1921 in Uman.  It received 26 performances in eight months throughout Kyiv Oblast and Podolia.  Printed by Kultura publishers in 1922, 3,000 of its 10,000 copies were distributed in North America.  It is set in a Galician city early in 1920, as the Red Army offensive against Poland was stalling, and tells of a failed insurrection organized by pro-Soviet Ukrainian activists in the workers' movement.

Married Life
Following the end of the civil war, Irchan settled in Kyiv where he met and married his wife Zdenka.  She was the daughter of a Czech doctor, and when her parents returned to Prague in 1922, the young couple followed them.  In Prague, Irchan enrolled at Charles University and participated in Ukrainian student activities.  He was well known as a writer by this time, and continued to publish articles and stories, some of which were printed in North America.

Canada
In 1923, Irchan was invited to come to Canada through ULTA (Ukrainian Labour Temple Association)  to edit their journal Working Woman (Робітниця), to which he had already contributed articles.  At this time Canadian Immigration only accepted immigrants as labourers, so he and his wife were invited to come to Canada by a Canadian farmer, in Gonor, Manitoba, where they lived for a time and he continued his literary activities.

Drama
In Canada, he was to experience the most creative literary period of his life, as editor, poet, storywriter, and playwright.

The first play he wrote in Canada was The Family of Brushmakers (Родина щіткарів).  In all cases where the drama of the doubting and confused mind is Irchan's interest, his work takes on a rich texture and offers many possible readings and many complex interpretations.   The Family of Brushmakers, in four acts, written between 1923–24, tells the story of a family of four people – three of whom at the outset of the play are blind. Only the son can see.  In Irchan's own words, “In 1915, while I was lying ill in a German hospital in the Austrian capital Vienna, I read in a German newspaper a story in a small corner of its last page that a blind brushmaker and musician living in Germany had a blind wife and daughter.  His only son, who had vision, was conscripted into the German army.  In time, the son returned home, but to the glory of the Kaiser and the great German Empire, he had given up his eyesight.  He had lost it during a poisonous attack at the front.  So the only member of the family with sight, the son, was now blind in a blind family.”   The play was a great success, staged 74 times from Montreal to Vancouver, and even the English Press had something to say about this “dangerous production”.

Departure
The reasons for his departure from Canada are manifold.  First, his wife Zdenka who was in poor health, with their daughter, Maya, returned to her parents in Prague. Secondly, the organizational activities which entangled him more and more with ULTA in Winnipeg left him little opportunity to develop as a writer.  Finally, some of the membership of ULTA may have encountered problems with his work, possibly finding it too much that of the expression of an individual rather than of their organization.  Whatever the reasons, on May 22, 1929, he left Winnipeg on his journey back to Europe.

Tragic Fate
Irchan returned to Ukraine at a time when Stalin’s repression of artists, academics, and gifted individuals in all fields was intensifying.

Irchan moved to Kharkiv, at that time the capital of Soviet Ukraine.  The city had writers’ organizations and publishers, and he had friends here in the writing community.  In 1934, he was one of many writers arrested by the State Political Administration.  His wife and daughter joined him in Omsk, Siberia, though it is unclear whether Zdenka did this voluntarily.  In a letter she wrote to a friend in Winnipeg, she says, “Please do not send me anymore newspapers, and notify New York to do the same thing, because they are causing me unpleasantness.  Some day I will write more.  Greetings to all.  Zdenka.”  But nothing more was heard.

Thirty-four years after Irchan's official rehabilitation in the Soviet Union, which was the result of Khrushchev's report revealing the criminal activity under Stalin's direction, the detail of Irchan's fate was made public. Irchan was interrogated by Pavel Postyshev who is considered to be one of the principal architects of the famine of 1932–1933, known in Ukraine as Holodomor.  Irchan was accused of “belonging” to the nationalist Ukrainian counter-revolutionary organization, which worked to overthrow Soviet rule in Ukraine by military means.  It now seems he was shot with so many other Ukrainian intellectuals on 3 November 1937 at Sandarmokh in Karelia.

References

Bibliography
 Balan, Jars.  The Ukrainian Canadian stage, in Slavic Drama. University of Ottawa, Ottawa, Canada 1991.
 Irchan, Myroslav. Internet Encyclopedia of Ukraine.
 Krawchuk, Peter. The Unforgettable Myroslav Irchan. Translated by Mary Skrypnyk.
 Shkandrii, Myroslav. The Rape of Civilization: Recurrent Structure in Myroslav Irchan's Prose. Journal of Ukrainian Studies 25 (2000).

External links
Shkandrii, Myroslav. The Rape of Civilization.
Irchan, Myroslav – Internet Encyclopedia of Ukraine

1897 births
1937 deaths
Ukrainian dramatists and playwrights
Journalists from Lviv
20th-century Ukrainian poets
Ukrainian translators
Writers from Kharkiv
Writers from Kyiv
People from the Kingdom of Galicia and Lodomeria
Ukrainian Austro-Hungarians
Austro-Hungarian military personnel of World War I
Ukrainian people of World War I
Ukrainian emigrants to Canada
Gulag detainees
People executed by the Soviet Union
Executed writers
Soviet rehabilitations
Ukrainian male poets
Great Purge victims from Ukraine
20th-century Ukrainian journalists
20th-century translators
Ukrainian avant-garde